Debra Karen is a Canadian film and TV editor known for her work on works like Meatballs and Happy Birthday to Me. In 2014, she was presented with the Canadian Cinema Editors' Lifetime Achievement Award. Her face appears on the artwork for David Cronenberg's film Shivers.

Selected filmography 

 The House by the Lake (1976)
 Ilsa, the Tigress of Siberia (1977)
 Blackout (1978)
 Meatballs (1979)
 Crunch (1980) (TV movie)
 Final Assignment (1980)
 Yesterday (1981)
 Happy Birthday to Me (1981)
 Heartbreak High (1981)
 Meatballs III: Summer Job (1986)
 The Incident (1990) (TV movie)
 Ivory Hunters (1990)
 The Last Elephant (1990)
 The First Circle (1992) (TV movie)
 Family Pictures (1993) (TV movie)
 Sweet Killing (1993)
 My Antonia (1995) (TV movie)
 Vanished (1995) (TV movie)
 A Green Journey (1997)
 Mandela and de Klerk (1997) (TV movie)
 The Legend of Sleepy Hollow (1999) (TV movie)
 Deadly Betrayal (2003) (TV movie)
 Salem Witch Trials (2003) (TV movie)
 Wicked Minds (2003) (TV movie)

References

External links
 

Canadian women film editors
Canadian film editors
Living people
Year of birth missing (living people)